The South Launceston Football Club is an Australian rules football club currently competing in the Northern Tasmanian Football Association. They were formed through a merger between City-South and East Launceston in 1986, clubs in the former Northern Tasmanian Football Association (which is not related to the current NTFA). South Launceston was in the TFL Statewide League from 1986 to 1997, then the Northern Tasmanian Football League until 2008, then in the Tasmanian Football League until 2013.

The club is nicknamed The Bulldogs, a name which was adopted upon the merger. City-South were the Redlegs and East Launceston had been known as the Demons. For their club colours they took City-South's red and white as well as the blue from East Launceston's guernsey to give them their current royal blue, red and white club colours.

Club history

The Statewide League Era
South Launceston's first taste of statewide football could be described as a failure. In 12 seasons in the Statewide Competition the Bulldog's never contested the finals with a highest finish of 6th in 1992. During these 12 years South Launceston managed to collect 3 wooden spoons, this feat has only been matched by New Norfolk who have spent a longer period in the statewide league.

Northern Tasmanian Football League
In 1998 South Launceston pre-empted the collapse of the statewide league in 2000 when they decided to join the NTFL. This move greeted them with success with them winning the 1998 and 1999 NTFL Premierships. South Launceston remained competitive while they were in this competition.

Tasmanian State League
In 2008 the South Launceston Football Club accepted an invitation to leave the Northern Tasmanian Football League (NTFL) and join the new Tasmanian Football League in 2009. After three seasons of very poor on-field performance, which included two wooden spoons and a win–loss record of 8–46 across the three years, the club appointed Mitch Thorp as playing coach for 2012. Under Thorp, the club rose to the minor premiership in 2013, with a record of 17–3, and went on to defeat Burnie in the Grand Final to win its first statewide premiership.

However, while its premiership season was ongoing, on 3 July 2013, a meeting of club members determined in a split vote to not pursue a further license in the Tasmanian State League beyond the season. The club rejected an opportunity to have a joint venture with the Prospect Senior Football Club for a 10-year license in the TSL.

The Prospect Senior Football Club and the Prospect Junior Football Club subsequently took up a 100% share of the TSL license and formed the Prospect State Football Club t/a Western Storm.

Northern Tasmanian Football Association
In late 2013 the South Launceston Football Club was successful in being accepted into the Northern Tasmanian Football Association (NTFA) and will play the first division against pre-merger rivals Longford and Scottsdale as well as previously amateur and country teams that make up the competition.  The South Launceston team that first contested the NTFA in 2014 was successful in winning the senior premiership with a victory over Deloraine in the Grand Final.

Honours

History of Chairperson
 2020–Present: Wayne Mitchell.
 2019: John Hosken.
 2016–2019: Felicity Viney, Legal Officer of Northern Prosecution Services.
 Unknown - 2016: Rod Patterson, Owner of Autobarn.

Club
 Tasmanian Football League (1): 2013
 Tasmanian State Premierships (7): 1928, 1930, 1932, 1954, 1960, 1966, 1972
 Northern Tasmanian Football Association (28): 1886, 1887, 1890, 1891, 1895, 1902, 1903, 1907, 1908,1910, 1914, 1921, 1922, 1928, 1930, 1932, 1939, 1941, 1952, 1953, 1954,1956, 1959, 1960, 1962, 1966, 1972, 1974

Individual
Tasman Shields Trophy winners
Harry Wade 1925
Laurie Nash 1931, 1932
Jock Connell 1934, 1939
Ted Pickett 1935
Max Pontifex 1938
Harry Styles 1948
Laurie Moir 1952

Hec Smith Memorial Medalists
Stuart Palmer 1971
Derek Peardon 1973
Rod Thomas 1983

All Australians
 Geoff Long – 1956

NTFA Leading Goalkickers
R.Ellis (10)- 1886
J.Riva (6) – 1887
C.Allison (6) – 1890
A.Norman (12) – 1894
A.Norman (8) – 1895
F.Angus (16) – 1896
A.Norman (10) – 1902
L.Firth (12) – 1904
Scott (12) & Waller (12) – 1906
L.Firth (12) – 1907
Ward (13) – 1908
Bob Nash jnr (71) – 1932
J.Martin (78) – 1946
Murray Bramich (61) – 1959
Stan Morcom (97)  – 1960
Graeme Wilkinson (54) – 1968
Craig McIntyre (74) – 1985

East Launceston
NTFA Premierships (1)
 1967

Tasman Shields Trophy winners 
Eddie Thomas 1961
Darrell Pitcher 1962

Hec Smith Memorial Medalists 
Peter Webb 1967
John Burns 1969
Paul Reinmuth 1981

NTFA Leading Goalkickers 
Roy Ringrose (50) – 1957
Roy Ringrose (55) – 1958
Paul Wharton (59) – 1980

South Launceston
Northern Tasmanian Football League Premierships (2)
1998, 1999

Darrel Baldock Medalists 
Scott Harris – 2000
Matthew Westfield – 2006

Tasmanian State League Premierships (1)
2013

Tassie Medalists 
Mitch Thorp - 2013

Northern Tasmanian Football Association Premierships (2)
2014, 2015

Records
Highest score - Regional Football
City/City-South – 38.15 (243) vs East Launceston in 1974
Cornwall/East Launceston 22.14 (146) vs City-South in 1958
South Launceston – 34.19 (223) vs Penguin in 1998

Highest score - State Football
South Launceston – 29.16 (190) vs Devonport in 2013

Most games
City/City-South – 224 by Geoff Long
Cornwall/East Launceston – 206 by David Thomson
South Launceston – 199 by Nathan Richardson

Team of the Century
An official 'Team of the Century' for City-South was announced in 2002, which took into account the period from 1886 until 1986, when they merged with East Launceston

References

External links
Official website (Archive)
Official Facebook
Official website

Australian rules football clubs in Tasmania
Australian rules football clubs established in 1886
1886 establishments in Australia
Sport in Launceston, Tasmania
Tasmanian Football League clubs
North West Football League clubs